Otar Chiladze (March 20, 1933 — October 1, 2009) was a Georgian writer who played a prominent role in the resurrection of Georgian prose in the post-Joseph Stalin era. His novels characteristically fuse Sumerian and Hellenic mythology with the predicaments of a modern Georgian intellectual.

Biography
Chiladze was born in Sighnaghi, a town in Kakheti, the easternmost province of then-Soviet Georgia. He graduated from the Tbilisi State University with a degree in journalism in 1956. His works, primary poetry, first appeared in the 1950s. At the same time, Chiladze engaged in literary journalism, working for leading magazines in Tbilisi. He gained popularity with his series of lengthy, atmospheric novels, such as A Man Was Going Down the Road (1972–3), Everyone That Findeth Me (1976), Avelum (1995), and others. He was a chief editor of the literary magazine Mnatobi since 1997. Chiladze also published several collections of poems and plays. He was awarded the Shota Rustaveli Prize in 1983 and the State Prize of Georgia in 1993.

Chiladze died after a long illness in October 2009 and was buried at the Mtatsminda Pantheon in Tbilisi, where some of the most prominent writers, artists, scholars, and national heroes of Georgia are buried. His elder brother Tamaz Chiladze is also a writer.

Bibliography
Otar Chiladze's novels characteristically fuse Sumerian and Hellenic mythology with the predicaments of a modern Georgian intellectual. He gained popularity with his series of lengthy, atmospheric novels, such as A Man Was Going Down the Road (1972-3), Everyone That Findeth Me (1976), Avelum (1995), and others. Otar Chiladze who became a Georgian classic author during his lifetime was awarded some Highest State Prizes of Georgia and in 1998 was nominated for the Nobel Prize along with five other writers. His works have been translated into English, Russian , Armenian , Estonian , Serbian, French, Danish, German, Bulgarian, Hungarian, Czech, Slovakian and Spanish. Otar Chiladze's novels A Man Was Going Down the Road and Avelum, translated by Donald Rayfield, were published in the United Kingdom in 2012 and 2013. 
 
The Cloud, Intelekti Publishing, 2014
The Sky Starts on Earth, Intelekti Publishing, 2010
Poetry Collection, Pegasi Publishing, 2010
Eternity Ahead, Intelekti Publishing, 2009
100 Poems, Intelekti Publishing, 2009
Tsete's Red Boots, Pegasi Publishing, 2007.
Happy Martyr, Logos Press Publishing, 2003 
The Basket, Rustavi 2 Print, 2003, Arete Publishing, 2006 
The Stairs, Publishing Sani, 2003 
Avelum, Merani Publishing, 1995 
The March Rooster, Merani Publishing, 1987, Arete Publishing 2007 
Remember Life, Publishing Sov. Georgia, 1984, Pegasi Publishing, 2010
The Iron Theatre, Merani Publishing, 1981, Arete Publishing, 2007 
Everyone That Findeth Me, Publishing Sov. Georgia, 1975, Arete Publishing, 2007 
The Other Side of Heart, Publishing Sov. Georgia,1974 
A Man Was Going Down the Road, Merani Publishing, 1973, Arete 2007 
Nine Long Poems, Publishing Sov. Georgia, 1969, 
The Child Humored the Guests, Merani Publishing, 1968
Clay Tablets, Publishing Sov. Georgia, 1963, 
Trains and Passengers, Publishing Sov. Writer, 1959

Prizes
 Literary Award SABA 2003 in category the best novel for The Basket. 
Ilia Chavchavadze State Prize 1997 for Artistic Work.
The State Prize of Georgia 1993 for his Contribution to the Georgian Literature.
 Shota Rustaveli State Prize 1983 for The Iron Theatre

References

1933 births
2009 deaths
Writers from Georgia (country)
Male poets from Georgia (country)
Dramatists and playwrights from Georgia (country)
Rustaveli Prize winners
20th-century poets from Georgia (country)
20th-century dramatists and playwrights
Magic realism writers
Postmodern writers
20th-century male writers
20th-century dramatists and playwrights from Georgia (country)